The KOMDIV-32 is a family of 32-bit microprocessors developed and manufactured by the Scientific Research Institute of System Development (NIISI) of the Russian Academy of Sciences. The manufacturing plant of NIISI is located in Dubna on the grounds of the Kurchatov Institute. The KOMDIV-32 processors are intended primarily for spacecraft applications and many of them are radiation hardened (rad-hard).

These microprocessors are compatible with MIPS R3000 and have an integrated MIPS R3010 compatible floating-point unit.

Overview

Details

1V812
0.5 µm CMOS process, 3-layer metal
 108-pin ceramic Quad Flat Package (QFP)
1.5 million transistors, 8KB L1 instruction cache, 8KB L1 data cache, compatible with IDT 79R3081E

1890VM1T
0.5 µm CMOS process

1890VM2T
0.35 µm CMOS process

1990VM2T
0.35 µm silicon on insulator (SOI) CMOS process
 108-pin ceramic Quad Flat Package (QFP)
 working temperature from -60 to 125 °C

5890VM1Т
0.5 µm silicon on insulator (SOI) CMOS process
 108-pin ceramic Quad Flat Package (QFP)
cache (8KB each for data and instructions)
 working temperature from -60 to 125 °C

5890VE1Т
0.5 µm SOI CMOS process
 240-pin ceramic QFP
 radiation tolerance to not less than 200 kRad, working temperature from -60 to 125 °C
System-on-a-chip (SoC) including PCI master / slave, 16 GPIO, 3 UART, 3 32-bit timers
cache (8KB each for data and instructions)
second-sourced by MVC Nizhny Novgorod under the name 1904VE1T with a clock rate of 40 MHz

1900VM2T
development name Rezerv-32
0.35 µm SOI CMOS process
 108-pin ceramic QFP
radiation tolerance to not less than 200 kRad, working temperature from -60 to 125 °C
 triple modular redundancy on block level with self-healing
 both registers and cache (4KB each for data and instructions) are implemented as dual interlocked storage cells (DICE)

1907VM014
0.25 µm SOI CMOS process; manufacturing to be moved to Mikron
256-pin ceramic QFP
production planned for 2016 (previously this device was planned to go into production in 2014 under the name 1907VE1T or 1907VM1T)
radiation tolerance to not less than 200 kRad
SoC including SpaceWire, GOST R 52070-2003 (Russian version of MIL-STD-1553), SPI, 32 GPIO, 2 UART, 3 timers, JTAG
cache (8KB each for data and instructions)

1907VM038
development name Skhema-10
0.25 µm SOI CMOS process; manufacturing to be moved to Mikron
675-pin ceramic BGA
SoC including SpaceWire, GOST R 52070-2003 (MIL-STD-1553), RapidIO, SPI, I²C, 16 GPIO, 2 UART, 3 32-bit timers, JTAG, DSP (same command set as DSP in 1890VM7Ya)
DDR2 SDRAM controller with ECC
cache (8KB each for data and instructions)
working temperature from -60 to 125 °C

1907VM044
development name Obrabotka-10
0.25 µm SOI CMOS process; manufactured by Mikron
256-pin ceramic QFP
SoC including SpaceWire, GOST R 52070-2003 (MIL-STD-1553), SPI, 32 GPIO, 2 UART, 3 timers, JTAG
radiation tolerance to not less than 200 kRad
triple modular redundancy in processor core
both registers and cache (4KB each for data and instructions) are implemented as dual interlocked storage cells (DICE) with 1 parity bit per byte for cache and Hamming code for registers
SECDED for external memory
working temperature from -60 to 125 °C

1907VM056
development name Skhema-23
0.25 µm SOI CMOS process; manufactured by Mikron
407-pin ceramic PGA
SoC including 8-channel SpaceWire, GOST R 52070-2003 (MIL-STD-1553), SPI, I²C, CAN bus, 32 GPIO, 2 UART, 3 timers, JTAG
cache (8KB each for data and instructions)

1907VM066
development name Obrabotka-26
0.25 µm silicon on insulator (SOI) CMOS process; manufactured by Mikron
407-pin ceramic PGA
SoC including 4-channel SpaceWire, GOST R 52070-2003 (MIL-STD-1553), SPI, I²C, RapidIO, GPIO, 2 UART, 3 timers, JTAG, PCI, co-processor for image processing
cache (8KB each for data and instructions)

1907VK016
development name Obrabotka-29
0.25 µm silicon on insulator (SOI) CMOS process; manufactured by Mikron
PGA
SoC including 4-channel SpaceWire, GOST R 52070-2003 (MIL-STD-1553), SPI, 32 GPIO, 2 UART, 3 timers, 128KB SRAM
triple modular redundancy in processor core

See also
 KOMDIV-64, 64-bit MIPS processors developed by NIISI
 Mongoose-V, a 32-bit MIPS processor for spacecraft applications developed for NASA
 Soviet integrated circuit designation

References

Radiation-hardened microprocessors
Avionics computers
MIPS implementations
32-bit microprocessors